Bamboosiella is a genus of thrips in the family Phlaeothripidae.

Species
 Bamboosiella antennatus
 Bamboosiella australis
 Bamboosiella bicoloripes
 Bamboosiella brevis
 Bamboosiella cingulata
 Bamboosiella elongata
 Bamboosiella exastis
 Bamboosiella fasciata
 Bamboosiella flavescens
 Bamboosiella fusca
 Bamboosiella graminella
 Bamboosiella hartwigi
 Bamboosiella lewisi
 Bamboosiella longiosanum
 Bamboosiella longirostris
 Bamboosiella longisetis
 Bamboosiella magnus
 Bamboosiella malabarica
 Bamboosiella malaya
 Bamboosiella microptera
 Bamboosiella nayari
 Bamboosiella pitkini
 Bamboosiella repentina
 Bamboosiella sasa
 Bamboosiella semiflava
 Bamboosiella speciosus
 Bamboosiella stannardi
 Bamboosiella thailandica
 Bamboosiella varia
 Bamboosiella venkataramani
 Bamboosiella xiphophora

References

Phlaeothripidae
Thrips genera